Candy Yuen Ka-man (born October 28, 1984) is a Hong Kong actress and presenter. Yuen was a contestant in the Miss Hong Kong 2009 when she won the Miss Photogenic Award. She is best known for the female lead in The Gigolo (2015) as Michelle.

Education
Yuen graduated from the University of Hong Kong with a major in comparative literature.

Filmography

Films

Television

Source:

References

External links
 
 
 Candy Yuen on Sina Weibo

1984 births
Living people
Hong Kong film actresses
Hong Kong television actresses
21st-century Hong Kong actresses